Grevillea tenuiflora, commonly known as tassel grevillea, is species of flowering plant in the family Proteaceae and is endemic to the southwest of Western Australia. It is a spreading to weakly erect shrub with divided leaves, the end lobes more or less triangular and sharply pointed, and clusters of whitish and violet-tinged flowers.

Description

Taxonomy
This species was first formally described in 1839 by John Lindley who gave it the name Anadenia tenuiflora in A Sketch of the Vegetation of the Swan River Colony. In 1845, Carl Meissner transferred it to Grevillea as G. tenuifora in Lehmann's Plantae Preissianae. The specific epithet (tenuiflora) means "thinly or delicately flowered".

Distribution and habitat
Tassel grevillea grows in heath, shrubland or woodland between York, Armadale and Wagin in the Avon Wheatbelt, Jarrah Forest and Swan Coastal Plain bioregions of south-western Western Australia. It grows in gravelly, sand or clay soils over laterite.

Conservation statusGrevillea tenuiflora'' is listed as "not threatened" by the Government of Western Australia Department of Biodiversity, Conservation and Attractions.

See also
 List of Grevillea species

References

tenuiflora
Endemic flora of Western Australia
Eudicots of Western Australia
Proteales of Australia
Taxa named by John Lindley
Plants described in 1839